Crepis atribarba is a North American species of flowering plant in the family Asteraceae known by the common names slender hawksbeard and  dark hawksbeard. It is native to western Canada and the western United States  It has been found in British Columbia, Utah, Washington, Oregon, Nevada, Idaho, Alberta, Montana, Wyoming, Colorado, Saskatchewan, and Nebraska.

Crepis atribarba grows in many types of mountain and plateau habitat. It is a perennial herb up to 70 cm (28 inches) tall, with a slender taproot and 1 or 2 slender stems. One plant can produce as many as 30 small flower heads, each with 6–35 yellow ray florets but no disc florets.

References

bakeri
Flora of Western Canada
Flora of the Western United States
Flora of the Rocky Mountains
Plants described in 1895
Taxa named by Amos Arthur Heller
Flora without expected TNC conservation status